The 2016 North Carolina election was held on November 8, 2016, to elect the Attorney General of North Carolina, concurrently with the 2016 U.S. presidential election, as well as elections to the United States Senate and elections to the United States House of Representatives and various state and local elections.

Incumbent Democratic Attorney General Roy Cooper chose not to run for re-election to a fifth term in office, but instead successfully ran for Governor.

Primary elections were held on March 15, 2016.

Democratic former state senator Josh Stein defeated Republican state senator Buck Newton in the general election.

Democratic primary
Attorney Tim Dunn had announced in November 2014 that he planned to run for attorney general if Roy Cooper did not run for re-election.  Cooper did run for governor as expected, but Dunn did not make any further announcements and did not end up running.

Candidates

Declared
 Josh Stein, former state senator and former deputy attorney general of North Carolina
 Marcus Williams, attorney, candidate for U.S. Senate in 2008 and 2010, candidate for NC-08 in 2012, and candidate for state senate in 2014

Declined
 Roy Cooper, incumbent Attorney General (ran for Governor)
 Tim Dunn, attorney and perennial candidate

Results

Republican primary

Candidates

Declared
 Buck Newton, state senator
 Jim O'Neill, Forsyth County District Attorney

Declined
 George Rouco, attorney and former CIA officer (ran for NC-09)

Results

General election

Polling

Results

References

External links
 Buck Newton for Attorney General
 Jim O'Neill for Attorney General
 Josh Stein for Attorney General
 Marcus Williams for Attorney General

Attorney General
North Carolina Attorney General elections
North Carolina